Gafi or GAFI may refer to:

 Financial Action Task Force on Money Laundering or Groupe d'action financière, an intergovernmental organization founded in 1989
 General Authority for Investment and Free Zones, Cairo, Egypt; see Entrepreneurship policies in Egypt
 General Administration of Financial Investigations, an intelligence agency in Saudi Arabia

See also
 GAFIA, a term used in science fiction fandom